Chicoreus paucifrondosus is a species of sea snail, a marine gastropod mollusk in the family Muricidae, the murex snails or rock snails.

Description

Distribution
This marine species occurs off New Caledonia.

References

 Houart, R., 1988. Description of seven new species of Muricidae (Neagastropoda) from the south-western Pacific Ocean. Venus 47(3): 185-196

Gastropods described in 1988
Chicoreus